Movak (also Romanized as Mowak) is a village in Enaj Rural District, Qareh Chay District, Khondab County, Markazi Province, Iran. At the 2006 census, its population was 112, in 25 families.

References 

Populated places in Khondab County